Davide Sancinito (born 4 September 1987) is an Italian footballer who plays as a midfielder for Serie D side asd albenga calcio

Club career
Sancinito started his career in smaller youth teams, his first major team was Serie D side Vado Ligure, where he played between 2013 and 2015. he spent half year at Eccellenza side Sanremese, then on the summer of 2016 he signed to Albissola 2010 on the same tier. The team promoted immediately to the Serie D, then Serie C. He made his professional debut on 19 September 2018, in the first round of 2018–19 Serie C against Olbia Calcio 1905. On 31 January 2019, he signed to Serie D side Sestri Levante.

Ahed of the 2019–20 season, Sancinito joined A.S.D. Imperia.

References

External links
 

1987 births
Living people
People from Albenga
Sportspeople from the Province of Savona
Italian footballers
Footballers from Liguria
Association football midfielders
Serie C players
Serie D players
S.S.D. Sanremese Calcio players
Albissola 2010 players
U.S.D. Sestri Levante 1919 players